Theo Zwanziger (born 6 June 1945) is a German lawyer and sports official. He was the president of the German Football Association (DFB) from 2006 to 2012. For his contributions to German football, he received the Bundesverdienstkreuz in 2005.

Career 
Theo Zwanziger was an amateur player for his local VfL Altendiez, playing there until 1975. He studied law in Mainz and graduated in fiscal and constitutional law. Between 1980 and 1985, he worked as a judge in Koblenz before joining the government of Rhineland-Palatinate as a representative of the CDU.

In 1992, Zwanziger entered the DFB as a member of the executive board ("Mitglied des Vorstandes"). He was a vital part of the groundbreaking 2001 decision to grant autonomy to the German Bundesliga professional teams, letting them organise themselves in the DFL (Deutsche Fußball-Liga). In 2001, Zwanziger was made treasurer of the DFB and elected vice president in 2003. For his contributions to German football, he received the Bundesverdienstkreuz in 2005. On 8 December 2006, he was named co-president alongside Gerhard Mayer-Vorfelder. After Mayer-Vorfelder left the DFB to become UEFA vice president in 2007, he became the sole president of the DFB.

On 2 March 2012, he stepped down.

In March 2016, the FIFA Ethics Committee opened formal proceedings against Zwanziger regarding the awarding of the 2006 FIFA World Cup.

Personal life 
Zwanziger is married and has two sons.

Litigation 
When the renowned sport journalist Jens Weinreich called him an "unglaublicher Demagoge" (unbelievable demagogue), Zwanziger unsuccessfully asked the Landgericht Berlin (country court of Berlin) to issue a temporary injunction against this statement. Zwanziger later publicly announced to go to the court of Koblenz, his former place of work for another attempt, resulting in further criticism from the press and journalists' associations. As of March 2009, Zwanziger's legal attempts to silence Weinreich have all but failed. Weinreich has publicly stated that he fears Zwanziger might continue to use SLAPP tactics to outspend Weinreich, hence accepting donations from the public to cover his legal expenses. On 27 March 2009, Weinreich and the DFB agreed out of court.

References 

1945 births
Living people
German football chairmen and investors
People from Rhein-Lahn-Kreis
Johannes Gutenberg University Mainz alumni
Christian Democratic Union of Germany politicians
Commanders Crosses of the Order of Merit of the Federal Republic of Germany
Association football executives